Armee-Abteilung Strantz / Armee-Abteilung C (Army Detachment C) was an army level command of the German Army in World War I.  It served on the Western Front throughout its existence.

History
Armee-Abteilung C was formed on 18 September 1914 from the left (southern) wing of the 5th Army as Armee-Abteilung Strantz, named for the commander of V Corps.  Strantz remained as commander of V Corps but was deputised in this post by a Divisional Commander.  It was established on 2 February 1917 as Armee-Abteilung C.  It was still in existence when the war ended, serving on the Western Front as part of Heeresgruppe Gallwitz.

Order of Battle on formation
The following Orders of Battle illustrate the growth of the Armee-Abteilung during the war.

Order of Battle, 30 October 1918
By the end of the war, the majority of the units assigned were lower quality Landwehr divisions.

Commanders
Armee-Abteilung C had the following commanders during its existence:

Glossary
Armee-Abteilung or Army Detachment in the sense of "something detached from an Army".  It is not under the command of an Army so is in itself a small Army.
Armee-Gruppe or Army Group in the sense of a group within an Army and under its command, generally formed as a temporary measure for a specific task.
Heeresgruppe or Army Group in the sense of a number of armies under a single commander.

See also 

German Army order of battle, Western Front (1918)
V Corps

References

Bibliography 
 
 

C
Military units and formations of Germany in World War I
Military units and formations established in 1914
Military units and formations disestablished in 1919